Acentrophryne dolichonema is a species of angler fish in the Linophrynidae family, first described in 2005 by Theodore Wells Pietsch III and Mitsuomi Shimazaki.

It is found at the bottom depths of the Pacific Ocean, off Peru, at depths of  201 - 1105 m.

References

Fish described in 2005
Taxa named by Theodore Wells Pietsch III
Linophrynidae